The Israeli Basketball Premier League Statistical Leaders, or Israeli Basketball Super League Statistical Leaders, are the stats leaders of the top-tier level men's professional club basketball league in Israel, the Israeli Premier Basketball League.

Statistical leaders by season

Scoring leaders

Rebounding leaders

Assists leaders

All-time leaders

Points

Source: basket.co.il

References

External links
Israeli League Official website
Eurobasket.com Israeli League Page